Yrd, or YRD, may refer to:

 The Yangtze River Delta in China
 Yrd, a common abbreviation for yard, a measure of length
 YRD, the IATA code for Dean River Airport, British Columbia, Canada
 YRD, the National Rail code for Yardley Wood railway station in the West Midlands, UK

See also